William Albert, 1st Prince of Montenuovo (8 August 18197 April 1895) was an Italian prince and Field Marshal Lieutenant of the Austrian Empire.

Early life
Count William Albert of Neipperg was born in 1819 at Parma, Duchy of Parma. He was the son of Adam Albert, Count of Neipperg (1775–1829), illegitimately (prior to his marriage in 1821) by his second wife, Marie Louise, Duchess of Parma (1791–1847). She was the daughter of Francis II, Holy Roman Emperor, and Princess Maria Teresa of Naples and Sicily. 

His mother Marie Louise was the second wife and Empress consort of Napoleon I from 1810 to 1814. She subsequently reigned in her own right as Duchess of Parma from 1817 onward. 

After the death of her husband Napoleon I, who died on St. Helena in 1821, she married morganatically to Adam Albert von Neipperg. As a result, William Albert was the half-brother of Napoleon II.

Military career
In 1838, he joined the ranks of the Austrian army and took part in the counterinsurgency battles of 1848 in Italy and Hungary, earning in 1854 the title of Second Lieutenant field marshal. 

In 1859, he took part in the disastrous Battle of Magenta, where the Austrian army was defeated by the Franco-Sardinian army. In 1860, he became commander of a regiment, and he was moved in 1866 to Bohemia. In 1867, he was promoted to General of Cavalry, remaining in office until 1878.

Prince of Montenuovo
In 1864, he was elevated to the status of Prince of Montenuovo in Austria, which is the Italian translation of Neipperg.

Marriage
William Albert married on 22 February 1851 in Vienna to Countess Juliana von Batthyány-Strattmann (10 June 1827 – 19 November 1871), youngest daughter of Count János Baptist von Batthyány-Strattmann (1784-1865) and his wife, Countess Marie Esterházy von Galántha (1791-1830).

They had three children:

Princess Albertine of Montenuovo (30 June 1853 – 13 November 1895), married in 1873 to Count Zygmunt Wielopolski, Marquis Gonzaga-Myszkowski, had issue.
Alfred, 2nd Prince of Montenuovo (16 September 1854 – 6 September 1927), married in 1879 to Countess Franziska Kinsky of Wchinitz and Tettau, had issue.
Princess Marie of Montenuovo (10 September 1859 – 2 March 1911), married in 1878 to Count Antal Apponyi de Nagy-Appony, had issue.

Honours
Parma
Knight Grand Cross of the Sacred Military Constantinian Order of St. George
Commander Order of Merit under the title of St. Louis
Austria
Knight of the Golden Fleece, 1867
Knight of the Military Order of Maria Theresa, 1848
Knight of the Imperial Order of Leopold, 1849
Medal of War
Other
 Grand Cross of the Order of the Red Eagle, 25 September 1877
 Knight of the Order of St. Anna
 Knight of the Order of Saint Stanislaus
 Knight 3rd class of the Order of St. Vladimir
 Knight of the Nichan Iftikhar
 Knight of Honour and Devotion of the Sovereign Military Order of Malta

Ancestry

Notes and sources

The Royal House of Stuart, London, 1969, 1971, 1976, Addington, A. C., Reference: 60 ; III 10
Jaromir Shepherd Field: The Military Maria Theresia Order and its members, Vienna 1857, S.1672-1676
P. Broucek: Montenuovo Wilhelm Albrecht Fürst von . P. Broucek: Monte Nuovo Wilhelm Albrecht Fürst von . In: Österreichisches Biographisches Lexikon 1815–1950 (ÖBL). In: Austrian Biographical Dictionary 1815-1950 (ÖBL). Band 6, Verlag der Österreichischen Akademie der Wissenschaften, Wien 1975, S. 361 f. Volume 6, published by the Austrian Academy of Sciences, Vienna 1975, p. 361 f. (Direktlinks auf S. 361, S. 362 ) (Direct-on p. 361, p. 362 )
Montenuovo, Wilhelm Albrecht Fürst von . Monte Nuovo, Wilhelm Albrecht Fürst von . In Constantin von Wurzbach : Biographisches Lexikon des Kaiserthums Oesterreich, 19. In Constantin von Wurzbach : Biographical Encyclopedia of the Empire of Austria, 19 Band, 1868 Band, 1868
Meyers Großes Konversations-Lexikon, Sechste Auflage, 1904–1911 Meyers Big Conversation Dictionary, Sixth Edition, 1904–1911

Italian princes
Italian military personnel in Austrian armies
1819 births
1895 deaths
Nobility from Parma
Knights of the Golden Fleece of Austria
Knights Cross of the Military Order of Maria Theresa
Military personnel from Parma
Sons of monarchs